The Switcheroo Series: Alexisonfire vs. Moneen is an EP released by the post-hardcore band Alexisonfire and indie rock band Moneen. It has been the first of only two releases in the Switcheroo series from Dine Alone Records. In the United States, Moneen's label, Vagrant Records, released the split EP on November 22, 2005, but titled the release "Alexisonfire/Moneen Split", this was because The Switcheroo Series is an EP series by Dine Alone Records, not Vagrant Records. Nine months after the US release of the split EP, Alexisonfire released Crisis on Vagrant Records, after completing contract terms with former United States label Equal Vision Records.

This album featured Alexisonfire covering two songs originally by Moneen and vice versa. Each band also contributed a third, original track. This CD is the first to feature new Alexisonfire drummer Jordan Hastings, who replaced original drummer Jesse Ingelevics.

Track listing

Personnel

Alexisonfire
 George Pettit – vocals
 Dallas Green – guitar, vocals
 Wade MacNeil – guitar, vocals
 Chris Steele – bass
 "Rat Beard" – drums 
 Mastered by Brett Zilahi 
 Recorded and mixed by "Juice"
 Produced by Alexisonfire and "Juice"

Moneen
 Erik Hughes – bass, backing vocals
 Kenny Bridges – guitar, lead vocals
 Chris "Hippy" Hughes – guitar, backing vocals
 Peter Krpan – drums
 Mastered by Brett Zilahi 
 Recorded and mixed by Greg Dawson
 Produced by Moneen and Greg Dawson

References

 CD liner notes

Alexisonfire albums
Moneen albums
2005 EPs
Split EPs